This is a list of mountains in Britain and Ireland by height and by prominence. Height and prominence are the most important metrics for the classifications of mountains by the UIAA; with isolation a distant third criterion. The list is sourced from the Database of British and Irish Hills ("DoBIH") for peaks that meet the consensus height threshold for a mountain, namely ; the list also rules out peaks with a prominence below  and thus, the list is therefore precisely a list of the 2,756 Simms in the British Isles (as at October 2022). For a ranking of mountains with a higher prominence threshold use:
 List of P600 mountains in the British Isles, for ranking by height and by prominence, of peaks with prominence over 

As of 31 December 2021, 7,098 people had climbed all 282 Scottish Munros, as of April 2020 eleven people had climbed all 1556 Marilyns of Great Britain, while as of October 2022 only five people had climbed all the 2532 Simms of Great Britain, Ken Whyte (Cruachan Beag 21/09/2010), Iain Thow (Cut Hill 07/06/2015), Michael Earnshaw (Cruach Fhiarach 16/07/2019), Rob Woodall (Sgurr Dhonuill West Top 28/06/2021) and Anne Bunn (Torr Ceum na Caillich, 24/09/2022). The first three have also climbed the Irish Simms, so including all the Simms of the British Isles.

Coverage of Simms 

Simms by height by prominence 
This list was downloaded from the DoBIH in October 2018, and includes all British and Irish peaks with a prominence below . Note that topographical prominence is complex to measure and requires a survey of the entire contours of a peak, rather than a single point of height. These tables are therefore subject to being revised over time, and should not be amended or updated unless the entire DoBIH data is re-downloaded again. The default table ranking is by height, so where the table is sorted by for example Region, the table will list the mountains within each Region by order of height.

DoBIH codes 
The DoBIH uses the following codes for the various classifications of mountains and hills in the British Isles, which many of the above peaks also fall into:

suffixes:
=	twin

See also 
Lists of mountains and hills in the British Isles
List of mountains in Ireland
List of Munro mountains in Scotland
List of Murdos (mountains)
List of Furths in the British Isles
List of Marilyns in the British Isles
List of P600 mountains in the British Isles

Notes

References

External links 
The Database of British and Irish Hills (DoBIH), the largest database of mountains in Britain and Ireland
Hill Bagging, the online version of the DoBIH
MountainViews, A similar organisation to the DoBIH offering a suite of lists for all Ireland
MountainViews: Irish Online Mountain Database, a searchable database for the MountainViews lists
The Relative Hills of Britain, a website dedicated to mountain and hill classification

Height
Articles with OS grid coordinates